The 2008–09 Football League (known as the Coca-Cola Football League for sponsorship reasons) was the 110th completed season of the Football League. It began in August 2008 and concluded in May 2009, with the promotion play-off finals.

The Football League is contested through three Divisions: the Championship, League One and League Two. The winner and the runner up of the League Championship are automatically promoted to the Premier League and they will are joined by the winner of the Championship playoff. The bottom two teams in League Two are relegated to the Conference Premier.

Promotion and relegation

As a consequence of results in the 2008–09 English football season, the following promotions and relegations involving teams within, or entering or exiting the Football League occurred. These changes take effect for the 2009–10 season.

From Premier League
Relegated to Championship
 West Bromwich Albion
 Middlesbrough
 Newcastle United

From Championship
Promoted to Premier League
 Wolverhampton Wanderers
 Birmingham City
 Burnley

Relegated to League One
 Norwich City
 Southampton
 Charlton Athletic

From Football League One
Promoted to Championship
 Leicester City
 Peterborough United
 Scunthorpe United

Relegated to League Two
 Northampton Town
 Crewe Alexandra
 Cheltenham Town
 Hereford United

From Football League Two
Promoted to League One
 Brentford
 Exeter City
 Wycombe Wanderers
 Gillingham

Relegated to Conference Premier
 Chester City
 Luton Town

From Conference Premier
Promoted to League Two
 Burton Albion
 Torquay United

Championship

Table

Play-offs

Results

Managerial changes

Top scorers

League One

Table

Play-offs

Results

Managerial changes

Top scorers

League Two

Table

Play-offs

Results

Managerial changes

Top scorers

Notes
Luton (−30), Bournemouth (−17) and Rotherham (−17) began the League Two season on negative points.

References

External links
Football League website
Soccerbase results database
BBC Sport football pages

 
English Football League seasons